Millka (Aymara for divisions with lines within a sown field, Quechua for the space between two furrows or boundaries, also spelled Millqa) is an archaeological site in Peru. It is located in the Ayacucho Region, Víctor Fajardo Province, Sarhua District, northeast of Sarhua.

References 

Archaeological sites in Peru
Archaeological sites in Ayacucho Region